Habibullah Bahar Chowdhury (1906 – 15 April 1966) was a politician, journalist, sportsman and writer from erstwhile East Bengal, now Bangladesh, who served in the political spheres of British India and Pakistan.

Early life and education
Chowdhury was born at Guthuma village in Feni district in 1906. His father, Mohammad Nurullah, was a munsiff. He passed Matriculation in 1922 from Chittagong Municipal School and ISc from Chittagong College in 1924. He then graduated from Calcutta Islamia College in 1928.

Career
In 1933, Chowdhury took up journalism and along with his sister, Shamsunnahar Mahmud, published the literary journal "Bulbul". Chowdhury actively joined politics as an activist of the Bengal Provincial Muslim League, and was elected a member of its executive committee in 1937. In 1944, he was elected publicity secretary of the League. He was elected a member of the Bengal Legislative Assembly from the Parshuram constituency of Feni district. He was the health minister of the first Muslim League cabinet in East Pakistan.

Works
After suffering a stroke, he resigned from the cabinet position in 1953. Chowdhury started writing books prior to 1947 partition. His works include "Pakistan", "Mohammad Ali Jinnah", "Omar Faruq", and "Ameer Ali".

Personal life
Chowdhury was married to Anwara Bahar Chowdhury (1919–1987). Anwara was a social activist and writer. She established Habibullah Bahar College in 1969 after Chowdhury's name. Together they had 4 daughters – Selina Bahar Zaman, Shaheen Westcombe, Nasreen Shams and Tazeen Chowdhury and one son - Iqbal Bahar Chowdhury. Chowdhury's grandfather, Khan Bahadur Abdul Aziz, an educationist, had a close relationship with poet Kazi Nazrul Islam.

References

1906 births
1966 deaths
Bengali writers
Maulana Azad College alumni
Date of birth missing
Place of death missing
People from Feni District
University of Calcutta alumni
Pakistani MNAs 1947–1954
Members of the Constituent Assembly of Pakistan